James Marshall Napier (22 October 1951 – 14 August 2022) was a New Zealand-born character actor, playwright and graphic artist. He is known for a succession of strong supporting roles in Australasian films and television shows. He has also had a notable stage career.

Biography 
Napier grew up in the city of Lower Hutt and was educated at Hutt Valley High School. He is the father of James Reuben Napier, actress Jessica Napier, and Rose Napier. He is the uncle of film director James Napier Robertson.

Before becoming an actor, Napier worked variously as a labourer, factory hand, and truck driver. He also spent a year studying graphic design at the Wellington Polytechnic. He landed his first professional acting job in 1975, at Wellington's Downstage Theatre.

In 1988, he moved with his wife and two young children to Australia, hoping to further his acting career. He soon became an established name in film, theatre, and television. His play Freak Winds has been performed in Australia, New Zealand, United States and Canada; other plays have been broadcast on Australia's ABC radio.

Napier died from brain cancer on 14 August 2022 in Canberra at the age of 70.

Theatre
A partial list of his theatre credits follows.

For Sydney Theatre Company:
The Present (2016–2017)  (Chekhov's Platonov adapted by Andrew Upton) With: Cate Blanchett, Richard Roxburgh, Toby Schmitz, Jacqueline McKenzie. The production opened in Sydney and toured to Broadway. – Ivan
In the Next Room – Mr Daldry
The Herbal Bed – Dr John Hall
Simpatico – Carter

For Belvoir Theatre:
Cat on a Hot Tin Roof (2013) – Big Daddy
The Power of Yes – Various
A View from the Bridge – Eddie Carbone
Diving for Pearls – Den

For Melbourne Theatre Company:
Frost/Nixon – Nixon
The Birthday Party – Goldberg

For Old Fitzroy Theatre:
Freak Winds – Ernest
Angel City – Wheeler
The Schelling Point – Kubrick

For Q Theatre:
Waiting for Godot – Vladimir

For Darlinghurst Theatre:
All My Sons – Joe Keller

For Griffin Theatre:
Speaking in Tongues – Leon/Nick
All Souls – Joe

Other:
Marat/Sade – Jaques Roux
The Duchess of Malfi – Ferdinand
Twelfth Night – Sir Toby Belch
The Dumb Waiter – Ben
The Tooth of Crime – Hoss
Ubu Roi – Captain MacNure
Happy Birthday Wanda June – Colonel 'Looseleaf' Harper

His play Freak Winds was produced in 2006 in New York's Upper West Side.

Partial filmography

Movies
Beyond Reasonable Doubt (1980) – Gerald Wylie
Goodbye Pork Pie (1981) – Police Officer
Bad Blood (1981) – Trev Bond
Carry Me Back (1982) – Airforce Security Guard
Came a Hot Friday (1985) – Sel Bishop 
Dangerous Orphans (1986) – Hobbes
Pallet on the Floor (1986) – Joe Voot
Footrot Flats: The Dog's Tale (1986) – Hunk Murphy (voice)
Starlight Hotel (1987) – Det Wallace
The Navigator: A Medieval Odyssey (1988) – Searle
Georgia (1988) – Frank Le Mat
The Big Steal (1990) – Desmond Clark
Flirting (1991) – Rupert Elliot
Shotgun Wedding (1993) – Det Dave Green
Spider and Rose (1994) – Henderson
Babe (1995) – Chairman of Judges
Dead Heart (1996) Sgt Oakes
Muggers (2000) – Prof Charles Lawrence
Bad Eggs (2003) – Doug Gillespie
 Travelling Light (2003) – Don Ferris
 Get Rich Quick (2004) – Turf O'Keefe
 The Water Horse (2007) – Sgt Strunk
 I'm Not Harry Jenson (2009) – Tom
 Griff the Invisible (2010) – Benson
 The Clinic (2010) – Marvin
 Down Under (2016) – Graham Steather
 Little Monsters (2019) – Army General
 Bellbird (2019) – Ross
 Earl's Town (2020) – Earl
 Northspur (2022) – Ted Summers

Television series
 The Neville Purvis Show – Larry Lucas
 Adventurer – George Mason
The Clean Machine (1988) – Keith Reid
Always Afternoon (1988) – Bill Kennon
 Mission Impossible (1989) – Talbot 
Police Rescue (1989–92) – Sgt. Fred 'Frog' Catteau [his daughter, Jessica Napier, played his character's daughter] 
Seven Deadly Sins (1993) – Tom
Secrets (1993–1994) – Gary O'Leary
 Blue Murder (1995) – Tony Eustace 
Halifax f.p. (1995) –  episode "Lies of the Mind" – Dr. Dale Counahan
Swimming Lessons (1995 TV movie) – Jim Sadler
The Beast (1996) – Commander Wallingford 
Twisted Tales (1996) – Tom
Water Rats (1996–1999) – Joe Da Silva
 Meteorites (1998) – Mayor Cass Cassidy
Airtight (1999) – Norscrum
The Lost World (2000) – Drakul 
 All Saints – Mick Mason
 Head Start (2001) – John Allott 
 Stingers (2001) – Eddie Thomas
McLeod's Daughters (2001–2006) – Harry Ryan 
Farscape – "...Different Destinations" – General Grynes
The Girl from Tomorrow Part II: Tomorrow's End – Draco
City Homicide (2007–2008) – Wilton Sparkes  
Chandon Pictures (2009) – Basil
Panic at Rock Island (2011) – Paul Thorpe
 Jack Irish (2012) – Father Gorman 
 The Moodys (2014) – Howard Benson 
 Love Child (2015) – Greg Matheson

Activism
In 2002, he and his daughter, Jessica Napier, won $64,000 in the Australian version of Who Wants to Be a Millionaire? for a South Australian animal rights group. Both are animal rights supporters and vegetarians.

References

External links
 

1951 births
2022 deaths
Australian male television actors 
Deaths from brain tumor
New Zealand emigrants to Australia
New Zealand male television actors
Australian dramatists and playwrights
People from Lower Hutt